The San Francisco Challenger was a train operated by Southern Pacific Railroad, Union Pacific Railroad and Chicago and Northwestern Railroad. Starting in 1936, it ran from Oakland, California to Chicago, Illinois via the Overland Route. Schedule was about 60 hours-- three nights and two days. In 1947 it was replaced by the Gold Coast, which was discontinued in January 1955.

See also
 Challenger — a Union Pacific and Chicago and Northwestern train that ran from Chicago to Los Angeles

References

External links
Union Pacific Website 

Passenger trains of the Union Pacific Railroad
Passenger trains of the Southern Pacific Transportation Company
Passenger trains of the Chicago and North Western Railway
Named passenger trains of the United States
Railway services introduced in 1936
Railway services discontinued in 1947